The First League of the Republika Srpska 2003-04 was the 9th since its establishment.

League table

External links 
 FSRS official website.

Bos
2003–04 in Bosnia and Herzegovina football
First League of the Republika Srpska seasons